Albert Brallisford (9 October 1911 – 1991) was an English professional footballer. A centre forward, he played for several Football League clubs in the 1930s.

Career
After beginning in local football with West Hartlepool Perseverance and Trimdon Grange Colliery, Brallisford joined Southport in 1932. After one League game, in which he scored for the Sandgrounders, he moved up the coast and joined Blackpool. He played seventeen League games for the Bloomfield Road club, finding the net on eight occasions.

In 1936 he signed for Darlington, for whom he scored 26 goals in 39 League outings. After one season, however, he left to join Gillingham in 1937. He made fourteen League appearances for the "Gills", scoring three goals.

He spent a brief spell in Northern Ireland with Glentoran, before retiring with Blackhall Colliery Welfare.

References

1911 births
1991 deaths
Footballers from County Durham
English footballers
Association football forwards
Trimdon Grange F.C. players
Southport F.C. players
Blackpool F.C. players
Darlington F.C. players
Gillingham F.C. players
Glentoran F.C. players
Blackhall Colliery Welfare F.C. players
English Football League players